Claveria is the name of three municipalities in the Philippines named after Narciso Clavería, the Spanish Governor-General of the country from 1844 to 1849.

Claveria, Cagayan
Claveria, Masbate
Claveria, Misamis Oriental